Easy Milano is a fortnightly magazine for the English speaking community of Milan.  The publication lists businesses and associations relevant to international expats, as well as bilingual Italians.

History and profile
Easy Milano was founded in 1999 by Editor in Chief Amie Louie and partner Aaron Pugliesi. In February 2000, it published its first issue and launched its website, which makes it the longest running English language publication catering to expatriates residing in Milan.

Easy Milano is published by its parent company B Easy S.r.l with the endorsement of the Comune di Milano (City of Milan) and the Provincia di Milano (Province of Milan).

Editors
Amie Louie (1999 to present)

Content
In addition to classified ad listings, Easy Milano releases articles and announcements from consulates, embassies and trade offices of English speaking nations present in Italy; such as the British Consulate, UK Trade & Investment and Embassy of the United States, Rome in Milan. It also interviews many influential figures, including politicians and members from the diplomatic community such as former mayor of Milan Letizia Moratti, former mayor of Milan Giuliano Pisapia, The British Ambassador to Italy, Edward Chaplin and former United States Ambassador to Italy Ronald P. Spogli.

Events
Easy Milano has organized many Anglo-themed events usually including charity fundraisers, such as J4 Milan, the U.S. Independence Day Celebrations, as well as high profile events such as the U.S. Election Night Party in 2008. These events have been frequently covered by national media in Italy such as Rai 3, Sky TG24, Telenova, La Repubblica  and Il Giornale.

See also
List of magazines published in Italy

References

External links

2000 establishments in Italy
Biweekly magazines published in Italy
City guides
English-language magazines
Expatriates in Italy
Listings magazines
Local interest magazines
Magazines established in 2000
Magazines published in Milan